Yano is a Filipino rock band.

Yano may also refer to:

 Yano (album), self-titled debut album of Yano
 Yano (surname), a Japanese surname
 8906 Yano, an outer main-belt asteroid
 Yano (Ghost in the Shell), a character from Ghost in the Shell
USNS Yano (T-AKR-297), a Shughart-class cargo ship
Shabono or yano, a hut used by the Yanomami